Lizette Etsebeth-Schoeman (born 3 May 1963) is a South African former track and field athlete who competed in the discus throw.

She was a two-time African champion, taking back-to-back titles at the African Championships in Athletics in 1992 and 1993. This made her South Africa's first female throws champion at the event. She also claimed a bronze at the 1994 Commonwealth Games and represented Africa at the 1994 IAAF World Cup.

She was a three-time winner at the South African Athletics Championships, taking consecutive discus titles from 1993 to 1995.

International competitions

National titles
South African Athletics Championships
Discus throw: 1993, 1994, 1995

References

Living people
1963 births
South African female discus throwers
Commonwealth Games bronze medallists for South Africa
Commonwealth Games medallists in athletics
Athletes (track and field) at the 1994 Commonwealth Games
Medallists at the 1994 Commonwealth Games